Susquehanna Community School District is a third-class school district in Susquehanna and Wayne Counties in Pennsylvania. The district's population was 5,195 at the time of the 2010 United States Census.

According to federal census data, its population has decreased by 299 residents from 5,494 residents in 2000. The district students are 97% white, 1% Asian, 1% black and 1% Hispanic.

The district operates one elementary school and one combined junior-senior high school.

Regions and constituent municipalities
The district is divided into three regions, which include the following municipalities (labeled by county):

Region I
Susquehanna Depot Borough (Susquehanna)

Region II
Lanesboro Borough (Susquehanna)
Oakland Borough (Susquehanna)
Oakland Township (Susquehanna)

Region III
Ararat Township (Susquehanna)
Harmony Township (Susquehanna)
Starucca Borough (Wayne)
Thompson Borough (Susquehanna)
Thompson Township (Susquehanna)

References

School districts in Susquehanna County, Pennsylvania